The 2011 edition of the Lebanese FA Cup was the 39th edition to be played. It is the premier knockout tournament for football teams in Lebanon.

Al-Ansar went into this edition as the holders. Al Ansar holds the most wins with 12 titles.

The cup winner were guaranteed a place in the 2012 AFC Cup.

Round 1

16 teams play a knockout tie. 8 clubs advance to the next round. Ties played between 14 and 18 January 2011.

|colspan="3" style="background-color:#99CCCC"|14 January 2011

|-
|colspan="3" style="background-color:#99CCCC"|15 January 2011

|-
|colspan="3" style="background-color:#99CCCC"|16 January 2011

|-
|colspan="3" style="background-color:#99CCCC"|18 January 2011

|}

Quarter-finals

|colspan="3" style="background-color:#99CCCC"|22 January 2011

|-
|colspan="3" style="background-color:#99CCCC"|23 January 2011

|-
|colspan="3" style="background-color:#99CCCC"|25 January 2011

|-
|}
 1 Match awarded to Al Ansar, Al-Mabarrah apparently withdrew.

Semi-finals

|colspan="3" style="background-color:#99CCCC"|7 April 2011

|-
|colspan="3" style="background-color:#99CCCC"|8 April 2011

|-
|}

Final

|colspan="3" style="background-color:#99CCCC"|7 April 2011

|}

References

External links
Soccerway.com

Lebanese FA Cup seasons
Cup
Leb